Àlex Corretja was the defending champion but lost in the semifinals to Jiří Novák.

Novák won in the final 6–1, 6–7(5–7), 7–5 against Juan Carlos Ferrero.

Seeds
A champion seed is indicated in bold text while text in italics indicates the round in which that seed was eliminated.

  Marat Safin (first round)
  Juan Carlos Ferrero (final)
  Sébastien Grosjean (semifinals)
  Àlex Corretja (semifinals)
  Roger Federer (first round)
  Franco Squillari (quarterfinals)
  Guillermo Coria (first round)
  Hicham Arazi (first round)

Draw

References
 2001 UBS Open Draw

Swiss Open (tennis)
2001 ATP Tour